The 1930–31 season was the 56th season of competitive football in England.

Overview
Aston Villa scored 128 league goals, a First Division record, and the number of goals scored per match, at just under four, was the highest in any season since 1900.

Manchester United lost fourteen consecutive matches, including twelve at the start of this season, to create a long-time record for most consecutive losses in top-flight English football. The record was beaten by Sunderland who lost the last fifteen matches of the 2002–03 Premier League season.

Chesterfield scored in 47 consecutive games between December 1929 and December 1930 in the Third Division North, setting the record for the most number of consecutive games in which a club has scored in League football; a record that would not be broken until 2003, when Arsenal scored in 55 consecutive games in the Premier League between May 2001 and December 2003.

Honours

Notes = Number in parentheses is the times that club has won that honour. * indicates new record for competition

Football League

First Division

Second Division

Third Division North

Third Division South

Top goalscorers

First Division
Tom Waring (Aston Villa) – 49 goals

Second Division
Dixie Dean (Everton) – 39 goals

Third Division North
Jimmy McConnell (Carlisle United) – 37 goals

Third Division South
Peter Simpson (Crystal Palace) – 46 goals

References